The Kosi or Koshi is a transboundary river which flows through China, Nepal and India. It drains the northern slopes of the Himalayas in Tibet and the southern slopes in Nepal. From a major confluence of tributaries north of the Chatra Gorge onwards, the Kosi River is also known as Saptakoshi for its seven upper tributaries. These include the Tamur River originating from the Kanchenjunga area in the east and Arun River and Sun Kosi from Tibet. The Sun Koshi's tributaries from east to west are Dudh Koshi, Bhote Koshi, Tamakoshi River, Likhu Khola and Indravati. The Saptakoshi crosses into northern Bihar, India where it branches into distributaries before joining the Ganges near Kursela in Katihar district.

But a review of 28 historical maps dating 1760 to 1960 revealed a slight eastward shift for a long duration, and that the shifting was random and oscillating in nature.

The river basin is surrounded by ridges which separate it from the Yarlung Tsangpo River in the north, the Gandaki in the west and the Mahananda in the east. Kamalā, Bāgmati (Kareh) are the major tributaries of Kosi River in India, besides minor tributaries such as Bhutahi Balān.

Its unstable nature has been attributed to the power it can build up as it passes through the steep and narrow Chatra Gorge in Nepal. During the monsoon season, It picks up a heavy silt load, which it redeposits at times, causing it to change its channel. This leads to flooding in India with extreme effects. Fishing is an important enterprise on the river but fishing resources are being depleted and youth are leaving for other areas of work.

Geography

The Kosi River catchment covers six geological and climatic belts varying in altitude from above  to  comprising the Tibetan plateau, the Himalayas, the Himalayan mid-hill belt, the Mahabharat Range, the Siwalik Hills and the Terai. The Dudh-Koshi sub-basin alone consists of 36 glaciers and 296 glacier lakes.
The Kosi River basin borders the Tsangpo River basin in the north, the Mahananda River basin in the east, the Ganges Basin in the south and the Gandaki River basin in the west. The eight tributaries of the basin upstream the Chatra Gorge include from east to west:
The three major tributaries meet at Triveni, from where they are called Sapta Koshi meaning Seven Rivers. After flowing through the Chatra Gorge the Sapta Koshi is controlled by the Koshi Barrage before it drains into the Gangetic plain.

The reason for such a large, deep gorge is that the river is antecedent to the Himalayas, meaning that it had existed before them and has entrenched itself since they started rising.

Peaks located in the basin include Mount Everest, Kangchenjunga, Lhotse, Makalu, Cho Oyu and Shishapangma. The Bagmati river sub-basin forms the south-western portion of the overall Kosi basin.

The Kosi alluvial fan is one of the largest in the world. It shows evidence of lateral channel shifting exceeding  during the past 250 years, via at least twelve major channels. The river, which flowed near Purnea in the 18th century, now flows west of Saharsa. A satellite image shows old channels with a confluence before 1731 with the Mahananda River north of Lava.

Floods

2008 flood in Bihar

On 18 August 2008, the Kosi River picked up an old channel it had abandoned over 100 years previously near the border with Nepal and India. Approximately 2.7 million people were affected as the river broke its embankment at Kusaha in Nepal, submerging several districts of Nepal and India. 95% of the Kosi's water flowed through the new course. The worst affected districts included Supaul, Araria, Saharsa, Madhepura, Purnia, Katihar, parts of Khagaria and northern parts of Bhagalpur, as well as adjoining regions of Nepal. Relief work was carried out with Indian Air Force helicopters by dropping relief materials from Purnia in the worst hit districts where nearly two million persons were trapped.
The magnitude of deaths or destruction were hard to estimate, as the affected areas were inaccessible. 150 people were reported washed away in a single incident. Another news item stated that 42 people had died.

The Government of Bihar convened a technical committee, headed by a retired engineer-in-chief of the water resource department to supervise the restoration work and close the breach in the East Kosi afflux embankment. Indian authorities worked to prevent widening of the breach, and channels were to be dug to direct the water back to the main river bed.

The fury of the Kosi River left at least 2.5 million people marooned in eight districts and inundated . The prime Minister of India declared it a national calamity. The Indian Army, National Disaster Response Force (NDRF) and non-government organizations operated the biggest flood rescue operation in India in more than 50 years.

Kosi Project

The National Flood Control Policy in 1954 (following the disastrous floods of 1954 in a large part of the Kosi river basin) planned to control floods through a series of dams, embankments and river training works. The Kosi project was thus conceptualized (based on investigations between 1946 and 1955), in three continuous interlinked stages

 Firstly, a barrage will be built at Bhimnagar to anchor the river that had migrated about  westward in the last 250 years laying waste to a huge tract in north Bihar and to provide irrigation and power benefits to Nepal and India. 
 Secondly, embankments will be built both below and above the barrage to hold the river within the defined channel. 
 Thirdly, a high multipurpose dam was envisaged within Nepal at Barakshetra to provide a substantial flood cushion along with large irrigation and power benefits to both countries.

This was followed by the Kosi Agreement between Nepal and India signed on 25 April 1954 and revised on 19 December 1966 to address Nepal's concerns. Further letters of Exchange to the Agreement between the two countries identified additional schemes for providing benefits of irrigation. While the first two parts of the plan were implemented by the Government of India, the Kosi High dam, the linchpin of the whole plan, for various political reasons has yet precluded any action for several years but has since been revived under a fresh agreement, in a modified form for further investigations and studies.

Kosi barrage

Kosi Barrage, also called Bhimnagar Barrage, was built between 1959 and 1963 and straddles the Indo-Nepal border. It is an irrigation, flood control and hydropower generation project on the Kosi River built under a bilateral agreement between Nepal and India: the entire cost of the project was borne by India. The highest peaks lie in its catchment. About 10% is snow-fed. A hydropower plant has been built on the Eastern Canal, at a canal drop ( from the Kosi Barrage), to generate 20 MW. A valuable bridge over the barrage opened up the east–west highway in the eastern sector of Nepal.

An inundation canal taking off at Chatra, where the Kosi River debouches into the plains, has been built to irrigate a gross area of 860 km2 in Nepal. The project was renovated with IDA assistance after Nepal took over the project in 1976.

Kosi embankment system

The Koshi barrage, with earth dams across the river, as well as afflux bunds and embankments above and below the river, confines the river to flow within embankments.

Sapta Koshi High Multipurpose Project (Indo-Nepal)

The governments of India and Nepal agreed to conduct joint investigations and other studies for the preparation of a detailed project report of Sapta Koshi High Dam Multipurpose Project and Sun Koshi Storage-cum-Diversion Scheme to meet the objectives of both countries for development of hydropower, irrigation, flood control and management and navigation. As currently outlined, the dam would displace approximately 10,000 people.

The dam is on the Sapta Koshi River with an underground powerhouse, producing 3,000 MW at 50% load factor. The Eastern Chhatra Canal and Western Chhatra Canal, off-take from the barrage site to provide water for irrigation both in Nepal and India and navigation through Koshi up to Kursela and also in the reservoir of Sapta Koshi dam.

A power canal existing Kosi barrage at Hanuman Nagar is proposed for conveying water for irrigation from the Eastern Chatra Canal and also water that may be required downstream for navigation. To utilize the head available between Chatra and Hanuman Nagar barrages for power generation, three canal power houses, each of 100 MW installed capacity are proposed on the power canal.

Extra storage capacity of Sapta Koshi High Dam would be provided to moderate downstream flooding.
Chatra Canal System would provide irrigation to large areas in Nepal and India, particularly in Bihar.
A Joint Project Office (JPO) has been set up in Nepal for investigation of the project.

Hydropower
Nepal has a total estimated potential of 83,290 MW with economically exploitable potential of 42,140 MW. The Kosi River basin contributes 22,350 MW of this potential including 360 MW from small schemes and 18750 MW from major schemes. The economically exploitable potential is assessed as 10,860 MW (includes the Sapta Koshi Multipurpose Project [3300MW] mentioned above).

Adventure sports

Commercial river rafting, also known as whitewater rafting, and canyoning is available on the Sun Koshi river and tributaries. Sun Koshi has challenging rapid grades of class 4–5.

Mahseer is widely distributed in Himalayan rivers up to  altitude and also inhabits the Kosi River and its tributaries.

Cultural significance

The Kosi was also called Kausika in Rigveda. It is a major tributary of the Ganges. One major tributary of the Kosi is the Arun, much of whose course is in Tibet. This river is mentioned in the epic 'Mahabharata' as Kausiki.
Formerly known as 'Kausiki,' named after the sage Viśvāmitra, who is said to have attained the status of 'Rishi' on the banks of the river. Viśvāmitra was a descendant of the sage Kusika.  Viśvāmitra is credited with many well-known Vedic Hymns on the Banks of the Kosi where he had his hermitage – The Mandala 3, the Rigveda, and the Gāyatrī Mantra. The Gāyatrī Mantra is a highly revered mantra based on a Vedic Sanskrit verse from a hymn of the Rigveda (3.62.10).

The mantra is named for its vedic gāyatrī metre as:
the verse can be interpreted to invoke the deva Savitr, it is often called Sāvitrī
recitation is traditionally preceded by oṃ and the formula bhūr bhuvaḥ svaḥ, known as the mahāvyāhṛti ("great utterance"). The Gayatri Mantra is repeated and cited very widely in vedic literature,
this is praised in several well-known classical Hindu texts such as the Manusmṛti, Harivamsa and Bhagavad Gita.

The Kosi is associated with many ancient spiritual stories. It is mentioned in the Bal Kand section of Valmiki Ramayana as the Kausiki who is the form assumed by Satyavati after her death. Satyavati was the elder sister of Viswamitra, descendants of Kushak dynasty. In the Markandeya Purana, the Kosi is described as the primal force. Due to the violent nature of the Kosi during monsoon season, legend says that Parvati, the wife of Shiva, after defeating the demon Durg, became known as the warrior goddess Durga who transformed into Kaushiki. In Ramayana, the river Ganges is depicted as her elder sister.
According to Mahabharata epic, the God of death took the form of a woman and resides on the banks of the river to limit population growth. Kosi resonates with the folklore of Mithila. The most important depictions of Kosi folklore are Kosi as a virgin absolutely care free and full of energy and as a frustrated wife of old hermit Richeek wandering in the Himalayas. Kosi is also invoked as the mother - 'Kosi Ma'. These images capture the contradiction that is inherent in the Kosi River as a source of life and death, prosperity and destruction; a mother and an enchanting virgin.

It is also the lifeline of the Mithila region, today spread over more than half of India's state of Bihar. It is the subject of legend and folklore of the region; the legend of Mithila extends over many centuries. Mithila is also the name of a style of Hindu art created in the area.

Protected areas
In Nepal two protected areas are located in the Koshi River basin.

Sagarmatha National Park

The Sagarmatha National Park encompasses the upper catchments of the Dudh Koshi River system. Established in 1976 the park was declared a UNESCO World Heritage Site in 1979. The landscape in the park is rugged consisting of mountain peaks, glaciers, rivers, lakes, forests, alpine scrubs and meadows. The forests comprise stands of oak, blue pine, fir, birch, juniper and rhododendron. The park provides habitat for snow leopards, red pandas, musk deer, Himalayan tahrs, and 208 bird species including impeyan pheasant, bearded vulture, snow cock, and the yellow-billed chough.

About 3500 Sherpa people live in villages and seasonal settlements situated along the main tourist trails. Tourism to the region began in the early 1960s. In 2003, about 19,000 tourists arrived in the area.

Koshi Tappu Wildlife Reserve
The Koshi Tappu Wildlife Reserve is situated in the flood plains of the Saptkoshi River in the eastern Terai. It covers an area of  comprising grasslands and khair–sissoo riverine forests. It was established in 1976 and was declared a Ramsar site in 1987. The reserve provides habitat for hog deer, spotted deer, wild boar, blue bull, gaur, smooth-coated otter, jackal, 485 bird species including 114 water bird species, 200 fish species, 24 reptile and 11 amphibian species. The last surviving population of wild water buffalo in Nepal is found in the reserve, as well as Gangetic dolphin, swamp francolin and rufous-vented prinia. A small population of the critically endangered Bengal florican is present along the Koshi River. There are also records of white-throated bush chat and Finn's weaver. The bristled grassbird breeds in the reserve. The reserve together with the Koshi Barrage was identified as one of 27 Important Bird Areas of Nepal.

See also
 List of rivers of India
 List of rivers of Nepal
 Kolasi
 Katihar

References

Further reading
 Floods, Flood plains and Environmental Myths – State of Art of India's Environment – A Citizens' Report, Centre for Science and Environment, 807, Vishal Bhavavn, 95, Nehru Place, New Delhi - 110019.
 A Framework for Sustainable Development of the Ganges- Brahmaputra- Meghna (GBM Region), Proceedings of Conference held in Dhaka, 4–5 December 1999–Nepal Water Vision in the GBM Regional Framework, Institute for Integrated Studies, Kathmandu.
 Water Conflicts in South Asia, Managing Water Resources Disputes Within and Between Countries of the Region (2004), Published by GEE-21Honolulu Hi 96825–0517, USA.
 Barrages in India (1981), Publication number 148, Central Board of Irrigation and Power, Malcha Marg, Chanakyapuri, New Delhi.
 Design and Construction of selected Barrages in India (1981), Publication number 149, Central Board of Irrigation and Power, Malcha Marg, Chanakyapuri, New Delhi.

External links

 CNN-IBN documentaries on Bihar Floods 2008 by Marya Shakil: Part 1, Part 2, Part 3, Part 4
Struggling rivers: crying waters
Legend of Kosi Maiyaa
GIS in Flood Hazard Mapping: a case study of Kosi River basin, India
Kosi floods - methods to minimize the effect
Expert's biggest fear about 2008 floods
Fixing Kosi - How is that possible

Rivers of Koshi Province
Rivers of Bihar
Rivers of Tibet
International rivers of Asia
Tributaries of the Ganges
Landforms of Tibet
Rivers of India
Braided rivers in India
Rivers of Madhesh Province